Acraea punctellata is a butterfly in the family Nymphalidae. It is found in Malawi and southern Tanzania.

Description
Very similar to Acraea nohara qv.

Taxonomy
It is a member of the Acraea cepheus species group. See also Pierre & Bernaud, 2014.

References

External links

Images representing  Acraea punctellata at Bold.

Butterflies described in 1912
punctellata